The 1850 United States census was the first federal U.S. census to query respondents about their "nativity"—i.e, where they were born, whether in the United States or outside of it—and is thus the first point at which solid statistics become available. The following chart, based on statistics from the U.S. Census from 1850 on, shows the numbers of non-native residents according to place of birth. Because an immigrant is counted in each census during his or her lifetime, the numbers reflect the cumulative population of living non-native residents.

(NA) Not available.
n.e.c. Not elsewhere classified.
1/ Prior to 1980, Taiwan included with China.

References

History of immigration to the United States
Demographics of the United States
Immigration to the United States